The Democratic Party for a New Society (abbr. DPNS) is a registered political party in Myanmar (Burma), founded in 1988 by Moe Thee Zun, the then Secretary General of the All Burma Students League (ABSL). The party campaigns independently from other parties and is unaffiliated with the more influential National League for Democracy (NLD), despite sharing similar goals.

History 
The Democratic Party for a New Society (DPNS) was founded on 14 October 1988 by students and youth, in response to the military junta government's suppression of the 8888 Uprising and pro-democracy movements in Myanmar. Its original organisation, the All Burma Students League (ABSL) was banned from participating in political reforms during the aftermath of the 8888 Uprising. After the military junta refused to recognise the results of the 1990 general election, the DPNS was declared illegal, and 1,500 of its members were arrested, with other pro-democracy movements and parties meeting a similar fate.

At the time of its founding, the DPNS was the second largest party, after the National League for Democracy (NLD), and attracted many young students, both from high schools and universities, many of whom were members of the ABSL. Initially, the DPNS was used as the legal political wing of the All Burma Students' Union (ABSU), and worked with the National League for Democracy (NLD) and other pro-democracy parties, but has since unaffiliated themselves with the NLD and registered as its own independent party.

Objectives 
The party's proclaimed objectives are as follows:
 To achieve democracy
 To protect human rights
 To attain peace
 To establish a federal union
 To create a sustainable developed society

References

External links 
 Official website of the DPNS (English)
 Official website of the DPNS (Burmese)
 DPNS Facebook page

Burmese democracy movements
Political parties in Myanmar
Political parties established in 1988
Decentralization
Progressive Alliance